Bazneshin-e Olya (also Romanized as Bāzneshīn-e ‘Olyā; also known as Bāzneshīn and Bāzneshīn-e Bālā) is a village in Rahimabad Rural District, Rahimabad District, Rudsar County, Gilan Province, Iran. At the 2006 census, its population was 234, in 64 families.

References 

Populated places in Rudsar County